Catherine Boursier is a French politician who was a Member of the European Parliament representing East France for the Socialist Party from 2008 to 2009. She was appointed to the vacancy caused by the resignation of Adeline Hazan.

Parliamentary service
Member, Committee on Civil Liberties, Justice and Home Affairs
Member, Delegation to the Euro-Mediterranean Parliamentary Assembly
Member, Delegation for relations with the Mashreq countries

References

1953 births
Living people
Socialist Party (France) MEPs
Politicians from Paris
MEPs for France 2004–2009
21st-century women MEPs for France